Qiyaslı or Kiasly or Giyasly may refer to:
Qiyaslı, Agdam, Azerbaijan
Qiyaslı, Agsu, Azerbaijan
Qiyaslı, Qubadli, Azerbaijan
Qiyaslı, Samukh, Azerbaijan